E. fenestrata may refer to:
 Eurymela fenestrata, the common jassid, a leafhopper species in the genus Eurymela and the family Membracoidea
 Euxesta fenestrata, a picture-winged fly species

See also
 Fenestrata (disambiguation)